The Pitsa panels or Pitsa tablets are a group of painted wooden tablets found near Pitsa, Corinthia (Greece). They are the earliest surviving examples of Greek panel painting.

Location
The four panels, two of them highly fragmentary, were discovered during the 1930s in a cave near the village of Pitsa, in the vicinity of Sicyon. They can be stylistically dated to circa 540–530 BC, i.e., to the late Archaic period of Greek art.

Technique
The tablets are thin wooden boards or panels, covered with stucco (plaster) and painted with mineral pigments. Their bright colours are surprisingly well preserved. Only eight colours (black, white, blue, red, green, yellow, purple and brown) are used, with no shading or gradation of any sort. Probably, the black contour outlines were drawn first and then filled in with colours.

Motifs
The tablets depict religious scenes connected with the cult of the nymphs.

One of the two near-complete examples shows a sacrifice to the nymphs. Three or more females, dressed in chiton and peplos, are approaching an altar to the right. They are accompanied by musicians playing the lyra and aulos. The person nearest the altar appears to be pouring a libation from a jug. A small figure behind her, perhaps a slave, is leading a lamb, the sacrificial victim. An inscription in the Corinthian alphabet names two woman dedicators, Euthydika and Eucholis and states that the tablet, or the depicted offering, is dedicated to the nymphs.

The second well-preserved tablet also has a written dedication to the nymphs and shows three partially overlapping female figures, perhaps the nymphs themselves.

Function and context
The tablets are votive offerings, connected with the rural cult of the nymphs, which was widespread throughout Greece. Stylistically and technically, they probably represent rather low quality panel paintings of their time. This, as well as references to wooden painted or inscribed votives at other Greek sanctuaries (e.g. Epidaurus), indicates that the Pitsa tablets belong to the types of votives available to the lower, or poorer, sections of population. Such simple votives may have been far more numerous originally, but the fact that they are made of perishable materials, whereas richer votives were of stone, bronze or precious metals, has led to their near-total disappearance from the archaeological record.

Significance
Most ancient paintings that survived are either frescoes or vase paintings. It is known that panel paintings were held in much higher regard, but very few of them have survived. The best known examples of ancient panel painting, the Fayum mummy portraits and the Severan Tondo, are of Roman date. The Pitsa panels, probably preserved due to the unusual climatic conditions inside the cave, are by far the earliest examples of this technique to survive. As the only pre-Roman specimens, they represent virtually all the evidence for a whole style of art. Incidentally, the ancient Greeks believed that panel painting was invented in Sicyon, not far from Pitsa.

See also
Archaic Greece
Art in ancient Greece
Ancient Greek religion

References

Bibliography
Larson, J. Greek Nymphs — Myth, Cult, Lore. Oxford University Press, 2001, pp. 232–233.
Boardman, J. and Callaghan, P. Western Painting, Greece,  Archaic period (c. 625–500 bc). Encyclopædia Britannica, 2008.

External links
Page about Pitsa on a site dedicated to ancient Sicyon
Pitsa panels on Foundation for the Hellenic World website

Ancient Greek religion
Archaic Greek art
Ancient Greek painting
Greek inscriptions
Greek animal sacrifice
National Archaeological Museum, Athens
Sicyon
Votive offering
Archaeological discoveries in Greece
1930s archaeological discoveries